Guinsiliban, officially the Municipality of Guinsiliban,  is a 6th class municipality in the province of Camiguin, Philippines. According to the 2020 census, it has a population of 6,685 people.

Geography

Barangays
Guinsiliban is politically subdivided into 7 barangays.
 Butay
 Cabuan
 Cantaan
 Liong
 Maac
 North Poblacion
 South Poblacion

Climate

Demographics

References

External links
 [ Philippine Standard Geographic Code]
Philippine Census Information

Municipalities of Camiguin